These are lists of the busiest airports in Europe from 2010 to 2015, based on various ranking criteria.

2015

2014

2013

2012

2011

2010

References

Airports in Europe